DWRC-TV was a commercial television relay station of ABS-CBN Sports and Action, a fully owned subsidiary of ABS-CBN Corporation. Its studio and transmitter facilities are located at Rooftop, TJ Building, Vinzons Ave., Daet, Camarines Norte, Bicol Region. This station is currently inactive. It operates daily from 6:00 AM to 12:00 MN.

See also
ABS-CBN Sports and Action
List of ABS-CBN Corporation channels and stations
DZDT-TV

ABS-CBN Sports and Action stations
Television channels and stations established in 2005
Television stations in Camarines Norte